Guntherichthys is an extinct genus of palaeoniscoid.

References 

Palaeonisciformes